A Sinus implant is a medical device that is inserted into the sinus cavity. Implants can be in conjunction with sinus surgery to treat chronic sinusitis and also in sinus augmentation to increase bone structure for placement of dental implants.

Types

Maxillary implant

A maxillary implant is an implant that is placed between jaw and the maxillary sinuses. It is inserted during a sinus lift or augmentation and used to increase the amount of bone to support dental implants. Implants are either inserted after drilling or by using a non-drilling method known as the osteotome technique. Issues such as bulging within the sinuses can occur with maxillary implants.

Maxillary implants can also be made using Choukroun's technique with subsinus filling material. The material is used to stimulate natural bone regeneration. A clinical study of this technique detailed all patients within the study had continuous stable implants six months after placement. It also showed vertical bone gain in all subjects.

Rhinoplasty

Numerous different types of material have been used as sinus implants during rhinoplasty procedures. Plaster of Paris is often used during rhinoplasty and implanted into the frontal sinus. Implants used in rhinoplasty have also been reported to cause enophthalmos.

Sinus stent
Steroid-eluting sinus stents maybe used in addition to endoscopic sinus surgery. They are, however, of unclear benefit as of 2015.

See also

 Bioresorbable stents
 Middle nasal concha

References

Medical devices
Implants (medicine)